Lorenzo Milá Mencos (born 8 October 1960 in Esplugues de Llobregat, Barcelona) is a Spanish newscaster and journalist. He is the son of José Luis Milá Sagnier, count of Montseny; younger brother of Mercedes Milá (also a TV journalist); and married to Sagrario Ruiz de Apodaca (also a TV journalist), with three children.

Milá obtained his Information Sciences degree in 1978 at the University of Barcelona. His career started as a sports journalist, working as an editor for the newspaper Sport. From 1986 onwards, he started to collaborate on various Televisión Española game shows. Between 1988 and '89, he lived in London and worked for Screensport. After that he returned to Spain and kept working at the Sant Cugat TVE center in the sports area.

In 1994, Milá moved to Madrid to anchor the newly created news broadcasts on TVE2, La 2 Noticias, which he headed until 2003. These broadcasts had a fresh style and were generally perceived to be more independent and less government-biased than those of the Telediario on TVE1, and both Milá and the program received many awards.

From September 2003 to September 2004, Milá was sent to Washington, D.C., as an adjunct foreign correspondent, accompanying his wife, who was the main correspondent there. After that, Carmen Caffarel, new managing director of RTVE (appointed by the Spanish Socialist Workers' Party, then in office) appoints Milá to become the main anchor of the nightly edition of TVE1's Telediario, in a bid to overtake the Antena 3 newscasts (anchored by the popular Matías Prats, who is also a former Telediario presenter) in the ratings, and recover the Telediario's leading position (lost in June 2003). This was finally achieved in 2007.

In addition to anchoring the Telediario, Milá also hosts the newly created program Tengo una pregunta para usted ("I have a question for you"), in which the audience on the set asks questions to politicians. This show has achieved the highest ratings ever in Spain for a program of political content.

On 31 July 2009, Milá anchored his last Telediario before returning to Washington D.C. as a foreign correspondent of TVE. In 2014, he later became TVE's foreign correspondent in Rome, Italy.

External links 

Blog by Lorenzo Milá and other Telediario anchors at rtve.es

1960 births
Living people
Spanish television journalists
Spanish television presenters
Spanish reporters and correspondents